Malik Hassan Sayeed is an American cinematographer, producer and director. He is represented by production company Little Minx.

School
Sayeed is a graduate of Howard University.

Awards
Sayeed's accomplishments in the commercial field include:
1999 - nominated  Independent Spirit Award: Best Cinematography for Belly (1998)

Feature films
Sayeed was a second unit director of photography on Stanley Kubrick's Eyes Wide Shut and Andrew Niccol's Gattaca and was the cinematographer for Hype Williams' Belly and Spike Lee's The Original Kings of Comedy, Girl 6, He Got Game and Clockers.

References

External links

American film directors
African-American film directors
Living people
American music video directors
Place of birth missing (living people)
Year of birth missing (living people)
American film producers
African-American film producers
American cinematographers
African-American cinematographers
Howard University alumni
21st-century African-American people